is a Japanese footballer who plays for Júbilo Iwata. Mainly as a defensive midfielder.

Career

Júbilo Iwata
Yamamoto, who was born in Hamamatsu, Shizuoka Prefecture, started his career at Seirei Junior Football Club before transferring to Júbilo Iwata's youth academy in 2002. He won himself a contract and was promoted to the senior squad at the end of the 2007 season after progressing through the youth ranks at the club and completing his two-year apprenticeship. He made his first team debut for the Júbilo in the J1 League match on 3 September 2006, when he came on as a late substitute for Robert Cullen in the 3–2 defeat to Oita Trinita at Ōita Bank Dome.

Albirex Niigata
On 16 June 2014, Yamamoto completed a move to Albirex Niigata on loan thus being reunited with former coach Masaaki Yanagishita. He made his Albirex debut on 19 July, starting against Urawa Red Diamonds, before being substituted by Sho Naruoka in the 84th minute. He scored his first goal for Albirex in a 3–0 win over Kawasaki Frontale at Big Swan on 5 October 2014. Yamamoto's second league goal for Albirex came in a 3–1 win over FC Tokyo at Ajinomoto Stadium on 22 November, scoring the winning goal for the away side. Following a successful debut campaign, Yamamoto agreed to a second season on loan at Albirex Niigata.

Return to Júbilo
After a two years-loan and some good displays with Albirex, Júbilo took back Yamamoto for 2016 season.

Career statistics

Club
Updated to 19 February 2019.

1Includes Suruga Bank Championship.

References

External links
Profile at Júbilo Iwata

1989 births
Living people
Association football people from Shizuoka Prefecture
Japanese footballers
J1 League players
J2 League players
Júbilo Iwata players
Albirex Niigata players
Association football midfielders